Adams is a village in Gage County, Nebraska, United States. The population was 573 at the 2010 census.

History
The area that would become the village of Adams was initially colonized by the namesake of the settlement, an Indiana pioneer named John O. Adams (1808-1887). Adams arrived in 1857; however, the village of Adams did not exist until John O. Adams negotiated deals with a railroad company that intended to set tracks through his land in 1873.

Geography
Adams is located at  (40.457526, -96.510322).

The village lies approximately twenty-five miles south of the state capital city of Lincoln.

Demographics

2010 census
As of the census of 2010, there were 573 people, 197 households, and 141 families residing in the village. The racial makeup of the village was 99.7% White, 0.2% Asian, and 0.2% from two or more races. Hispanic or Latino of any race were 0.7% of the population.

There were 197 households, of which 38.6% had children under the age of 18 living with them, 53.8% were married couples living together, 11.2% had a female householder with no husband present, 6.6% had a male householder with no wife present, and 28.4% were non-families. 27.4% of all households were made up of individuals, and 17.8% had someone living alone who was 65 years of age or older. The average household size was 2.37 and the average family size was 2.84.

The median age in the village was 40.8 years. 24.6% of residents were under the age of 18; 9% were between the ages of 18 and 24; 20.5% were from 25 to 44; 17.6% were from 45 to 64; and 28.3% were 65 years of age or older. The gender makeup of the village was 49.7% male and 50.3% female.

2000 census
As of the census of 2000, there were 489 people, 187 households, and 123 families residing in the village. The population density was 821.8 people per square mile (314.7/km). There were 200 housing units at an average density of 336.1 per square mile (128.7/km). The racial makeup of the village was 99.18% White, and 0.82% from two or more races. Hispanic or Latino of any race were 1.23% of the population.

There were 187 households, out of which 31.0% had children under the age of 18 living with them, 55.6% were married couples living together, 6.4% had a female householder with no husband present, and 33.7% were non-families. 32.1% of all households were made up of individuals, and 23.0% had someone living alone who was 65 years of age or older. The average household size was 2.25 and the average family size was 2.85.

In the village, the population was spread out, with 21.5% under the age of 18, 4.1% from 18 to 24, 23.9% from 25 to 44, 14.7% from 45 to 64, and 35.8% who were 65 years of age or older. The median age was 45 years. For every 100 females, there were 76.5 males. For every 100 females age 18 and over, there were 73.0 males.

As of 2000 the median income for a household in the village was $35,625, and the median income for a family was $44,792. Males had a median income of $30,139 versus $17,431 for females. The per capita income for the village was $15,243. About 1.7% of families and 3.0% of the population were below the poverty line, including none of those under age 18 and 10.0% of those age 65 or over.

Religion
The village of Adams is the location of three churches, all of which pertaining to denominations of traditional Protestantism. Of the three, the American Lutheran Church is the only non-Methodist church within the village's borders. A chapel is also located within the Gold Crest Retirement Center, which is also located within the boundaries of Adams.

Culture
Two marked festivals occur in the village of Adams annually. The first of the two is centered around American Independence Day celebrations and encompasses volleyball and softball sporting events, a village-wide barbecue, and a fireworks show; this takes place on the first Saturday of every July. A second event celebrated in the village is Adams Community Days, which hosts both volleyball, golf, and softball sporting events; another pan-village barbecue, and several tractor pull events.

Education
The village of Adams is home to both the offices and facilities of the Daniel Freeman Public School district, a Class 3 entity composed of Freeman Elementary School and Freeman High School. The school district is one of four school districts serving Gage County.

Healthcare
The village of Adams is home to the Adams Primary Care Clinic, a satellite of the Saint Elizabeth Physician Network spearheaded by Saint Elizabeth Regional Medical Center in the state capital of Lincoln. It also houses the Lake Crest Pharmacy, which serves Adams and neighboring communities as well. Offices pertaining to orthodontics, dentistry, and optometry are located in the village of Adams, although all three are secondary to the main offices in the city of Lincoln to the north.

References

Villages in Gage County, Nebraska
Villages in Nebraska